Hans Christian Gerlach is professor of Modern History at the University of Bern. Gerlach is also Associate Editor of the Journal of Genocide Research and author of multiple books dealing with the Hunger Plan, the Holocaust, and genocide.

Writings
His books include Krieg, Ernährung, Volkermord: Forschungen zur Deutschen Vernichtungspolitik im Zweiten Weltkrieg (1998); Kalkulierte Morde: die Deutsche Wirtschafts- und Vernichtungspolitik in Weissrussland 1941 bis 1944 (1999); Das letzte Kapitel (co-authored with and Götz Aly in 2002); and Sur la conférence de Wannsee (2002).

Ideas
Gerlach's article "Extremely Violent Societies: An Alternative to the Concept of Genocide" has been the subject of great debate among scholars of genocide and violence. In the article, Gerlach challenges the model utilized in trying to understand genocide. Gerlach has previously stirred intense debate among Holocaust historians with his thesis surrounding December 12, 1941, as the date on which Adolf Hitler made the decision to annihilate the Jews of Europe.

Gerlach is also known by his critical attitude towards the national-conservative resistance in Nazi Germany. According to Gerlach, the resistance offered by officers such as Claus von Stauffenberg and Henning von Tresckow, who were responsible for the assassination attempt on Hitler on 20 July 1944, was insincere, and Tresckow and many other resistance fighters were heavily implicated in Nazi war crimes.

Gerlach's thesis was criticized by a number of scholars, among them Peter Hoffmann from McGill University and Klaus Jochen Arnold, from the Konrad-Adenauer-Stiftung, a political party foundation associated with the Christian Democratic Union of Germany (CDU). In 2011, Danny Orbach, a Harvard based historian, wrote that Gerlach's reading of the sources is highly skewed, and, at times, diametrically opposed to what they actually say. In one case, according to Orbach, Gerlach had falsely paraphrased the memoir of the resistance fighter Colonel Rudolf Christoph Freiherr von Gersdorff, and in another case, quoted misleadingly from an SS document. Hence, Orbach concludes that Gerlach's thesis on the German resistance is highly unreliable.

Other historians agree with Gerlach's findings. For example, the research by Johannes Hürter, a historian at the Institute for Contemporary History in Munich, confirms the culpability of the staff of Army Group Center in war crimes and Nazi atrocities. In his work Auf dem Weg zur Militaeropposition: Tresckow, Gersdoff, der Vernichtungskrieg und der Judenmord ("Resistance in the Military: Tresckow, Gersdoff, the War of Extermination and the Murder of Jews"), Huerter analyzes documents on the relationship of Army Group Centre with the Einsatzgruppe B in 1941. He concludes that Tresckow and his circle of conspirators within the Army Group Center were well informed about the mass murder of Jews following Operation Barbarossa and provided required cooperation. Their national-conservative ideology was aligned with the Nazi regime in its anti-communism, accompanied by racial prejudice against Slavs and Jews. Only when it became apparent that the defeat was imminent, and that Germany would be held responsible for its genocidal policies, did so-called ethical considerations came into play, he finds.

References

Citations

Bibliography

External links 
 Christian Gerlach in the German National Library catalogue (German)
  Curriculum Vitae - Present Position, Education, Books, Awards

21st-century Swiss historians
Swiss male writers
Living people
Year of birth missing (living people)
Historians of the Holocaust
Academic staff of the University of Bern